This is a list of college athletics programs in the U.S. state of Alabama.

NCAA

Division I

Division II

Division III

NAIA

NJCAA

USCAA

Former college athletic programs

See also 
List of NCAA Division I institutions
List of NCAA Division II institutions
List of NCAA Division III institutions
List of NAIA institutions
List of USCAA institutions
List of NCCAA institutions

College sports in Alabama
Alabama
College athletic programs
College athletic programs